Carol Kenyon (sometimes spelt Karol; born 1959) is a British singer. She is best known for her vocals on the Heaven 17 hit song "Temptation", which reached number two in the UK Singles Chart in 1983. When the song was re-released as a remix by Brothers in Rhythm in 1992, again featuring Carol's vocals, it made number 4. She was also featured on the Paul Hardcastle hit "Don't Waste My Time", which got to number 8 in 1986.

Early life
When Kenyon was a child, she was encouraged to sing and dance. She took lessons and entered arts festival contests. She played piano. She enjoyed listening to the collection of jazz records her father had. 

She was singing with a school choir at a music festival in Harrow. A young musician also appearing there, Guy Barker, heard her. He encouraged her to work more seriously on singing.

Eventually Barker encouraged her to attend an National Youth Jazz Orchestra (NYJO) engagement. There, after hearing her sing, NYJO took her on, as its first regular band singer. She was only 14.

Career
Although primarily known as a session vocalist on many albums and singles by a variety of prominent artists, as well as in many concerts, Kenyon has also released several singles as a solo artist. Her first single was "Warrior Woman" which was released on A&M Records in 1984.

Her early performances were as part of the National Youth Jazz Orchestra. She has also sung with Go West, Duran Duran, Kylie Minogue, Mike Oldfield, Jon and Vangelis, Pet Shop Boys, Gary Moore, Dexys Midnight Runners, Pink Floyd, Tommy Shaw, Roger Waters, Morrissey–Mullen, Tears for Fears, Rapino Brothers, Paul Hardcastle, Ultravox and Van Morrison. In 1993, Kenyon appeared with David Suchet in Agatha Christie's Poirot novella Yellow Iris.

Career highlights
1981: Sang the winning song at the Castlebar Song Contest "I Wasn't Born Yesterday" written by Miki Antony & Robin Smith
1981: Backing vocals on the Jon & Vangelis album The Friends of Mr Cairo
1982: Backing vocals on the Chris Rea self-titled album
1982: Vocals on the Morrissey–Mullen album Life on the Wire
1982: Vocals on the Dexys Midnight Runners album Too-Rye-Ay
1983: Vocals on the Heaven 17 single "Temptation" (UK #2)
1984: Duet vocals on the Tommy Shaw album Girls with Guns on the track Outside in the Rain
1984: Backing vocals on the Vangelis/Demis Roussos album Reflection
1984: Backing vocals on the Van Morrison live album Live at the Grand Opera House Belfast
1984: Lead vocals on the Malcolm McLaren single "Madame Butterfly" from the album Fans
1986: Lead vocals on the Paul Hardcastle single "Don't Waste My Time" (UK #8)
1986: Additional vocals on the album Into the Light by Chris de Burgh
1986: Backing vocals on the Nik Kershaw album Radio Musicola
1986: Backing vocals on the Ultravox songs Same Old Story and The Prize
1986: Backing vocals on Robbie Nevil by Robbie Nevil
1986: Backing vocals on Trouble in Paradise by Anri
1988: Vocals on the album My Nation Underground by Julian Cope
1988: Backing vocals on Anderson Bruford Wakeman Howe self-titled album
1989: Lead vocals on the Mike Oldfield single "Nothing But" on the album Earth Moving
1989: Backing vocals on the album The Seeds of Love by Tears for Fears
1989: Backing vocals on the album Vigil in a Wilderness of Mirrors by Fish
1989: Backing vocals on the album Results by Liza Minnelli
1989: Backing vocals on the album Donny Osmond by Donny Osmond on the track Sacred Emotion
1989: Backing vocals on the album Swamp by Phil Thornalley
1989: Backing vocals on the album Avalon Sunset by Van Morrison
1990: Backing vocals on the album Peace of Mind by Breathe
1990: Backing vocals on the album Naked Thunder by Ian Gillan
1990: Backing vocals on the album In ogni senso by Eros Ramazzotti
1990: Backing vocals on the album Circle of One by Oleta Adams
1990: Backing vocals on the album Liberty by Duran Duran
1990: Additional vocals on the album Behaviour by Pet Shop Boys
1991: Backing vocals on the album Real Life by Simple Minds
1991: Backing vocals on the album No Place Like Home by Big Country
1991: Backing vocals on the album Hymns to the Silence by Van Morrison
1991: Backing vocals on the album Let's Get to It by Kylie Minogue
1991: Backing vocals on the album Free by Rick Astley
1991: Backing vocals on the album Auberge by Chris Rea
1992: Backing vocals on the album After Hours by Gary Moore
1994: Backing vocals on the album The Division Bell by Pink Floyd
1995: Backing vocals on the album Alternative by Pet Shop Boys
1996: Backing vocals on the album Soft Vengeance by Manfred Mann's Earth Band
1996: Backing vocals on the album Universal by Orchestral Manoeuvres in the Dark
1997: Backing vocals on the album The Big Picture by Elton John
1998: Backing vocals on the album Songs of Praise by Bullyrag
1999: Backing vocals on the album Nightlife by Pet Shop Boys
2001: Backing vocals on David Gilmour concert at Meltdown festival and corresponding David Gilmour in Concert DVD
2002: Backing vocals on Roger Waters' In the Flesh tour
2005: With Pink Floyd at the Live 8 concert, London in Hyde Park
2006–2008: Backing and lead vocals on Roger Waters' Dark Side of the Moon Live world tour (including his appearance at Live Earth 7 July 2007, Giants Stadium, East Rutherford, NJ)

Discography

References

External links

Living people
1959 births
British session musicians
20th-century Black British women singers
English people of Guyanese descent
A&M Records artists
Castlebar Song Contest winners
National Youth Jazz Orchestra members
Morrissey–Mullen members
21st-century Black British women singers